Colwyn Trevarthen (born 1931) is Emeritus Professor of Child Psychology and Psychobiology at the University of Edinburgh.

Background

After training as a biologist in New Zealand at Auckland University College and Otago University, Trevarthen researched infancy at Harvard in 1967.

Work

Trevarthen has published on brain development, infant communication and emotional health. He believes that very young babies rapidly develop proto-cultural intelligence through interacting with other people, including in teasing fun play. For instance he has demonstrated that a newborn has an innate ability to initiate a dialogic relationship with an adult, and then build up this relationship through eye contact, smiling, and other holistic body functions rhythmically and cooperatively.

He studied successful interactions between infants and their primary care givers, and found that the mother's responsiveness to her baby's initiatives supported and developed intersubjectivity (shared understanding), which he regarded as the basis of all effective communication, interaction and learning.

He has applied intersubjectivity to the very rapid cultural development of new born infants. and used the term ‘primary intersubjectivity’ to refer to early developing sensory-motor processes of interaction between infants and caregivers. He believes babies are looking for companionship (including the sense of fun and playfulness), engagement and relationship (rather than using the term attachment), and that companions can include mothers, fathers, other adults, peers and siblings; he has said "I think the ideal companion – and it can be a practitioner or not – is a familiar person who really treats the baby with playful human respect."

In later years his work has focused on the musicality of babies, including its use in communication.

He is a fellow of the Norwegian Academy of Science and Letters.

Video interaction guidance

In the 1980s Harry Biemans, in the Netherlands, applied Trevarthen's research using video clips and created video interaction guidance (VIG), which is used for instance with mothers and young babies in attachment-based therapy.

Quote
Stephen Seligman said Trevarthen "has distinguished himself for more than four decades as one of the most inventive and rigorous explorers of infant development and its implications. Among the infant research cognoscenti, he ranks... in breaking misleading assumptions of the varied disciplines to see what mothers and babies really do."

See also
 Baby talk
 Attachment-based therapy
 Intersubjectivity
 Musicality
 Interaction theory

References 

1931 births
Living people
Academics of the University of Edinburgh
Members of the Norwegian Academy of Science and Letters
British family and parenting writers